The Mrs. Isaac D. Adler House is a property in Libertyville, Illinois, United States designed by architect David Adler for his mother Therese Hyman Adler.

History
The original house on this lot in Libertyville, Illinois was built in 1914, when the Miller and Austin Subdivision was created. In 1930, Therese Hyman Adler, the widow of clothing wholesaler Isaac D. Adler and mother of architect David Adler, purchased this lot from Oscar D. and Anne F. Stern. The  property was adjacent to her son's estate. Mrs. Adler had been living in Chicago since 1925, when her husband died in a car accident. She may have lived in David Adler's apartment at 1240 North State Street. David Adler treated his mother's property as part of the estate, building a road between the two houses and coordinating a matching landscape.

David Adler extensively remodeled the house for his mother starting in January 1931. The original building was probably a Dutch Colonial. To this, Adler added a second porch on the west, adjusted window fenestrations, added a front pediment, and third-story dormers. The interior was left largely intact, although Adler did install a historic French fireplace and replaced the floors & staircase. The finished product was still largely Dutch Colonial, but showed heavy American Colonial influence. The house closely resembled a Sears Catalog Home design. Adler also extensively remodeled the garage/barn structure at the front of the property. He built a three-room apartment on the top floor and added a cupola. The final work on the property was completed in April 1934, when it was landscaped.

Mrs. Adler died in 1939 and the house passed to David. When David Adler died in 1949, the house was bequeathed to his sister, Frances Elkins. However, Elkins had a successful interior design practice in California and had little interest in the Illinois property. She let the Village of Libertyville use the property for recreational purposes, but the village struggled to maintain the costly property. The house was sold to William Wittort, who had been renting the property, in 1954. Subsequent owners have made few changes to the house. The road linking the house to her son's was expanded to Milwaukee Avenue in the 1970s and was opened to the public as Parkview Drive. The  property was recognized by the National Park Service with a listing on the National Register of Historic Places on August 28, 2002. It was listed as a historic district with four contributing properties: the house, the garage/barn, and two octagonal small buildings (a pump house and a tool shed).

References

External links

National Register of Historic Places in Lake County, Illinois
Colonial Revival architecture in Illinois
Houses completed in 1933
Libertyville, Illinois
David Adler buildings
Houses on the National Register of Historic Places in Illinois
Houses in Lake County, Illinois
Historic districts on the National Register of Historic Places in Illinois
1933 establishments in Illinois